Ata Pata Laapata is a 2012 Indian Hindi-language musical satire film directed by Rajpal Yadav and produced by his wife Radha Yadav, who makes his directorial debut with the film and also plays the protagonist who enlists the help of law when his house goes missing from the constructed site, and finds himself suspected instead. Other than Yadav, the film stars the ensemble cast of Asrani, Om Puri, Ashutosh Rana, Manoj Joshi, Govind Namdev, Dara Singh, Vikram Gokhale, Vijay Raaz and Satyadev Dubey. The film was produced by Yadav's wife Radha Yadav. Released on 2 November 2012, the film was a commercial failure and panned for its script.

Plot
Manav Chaturvedi (Rajpal Yadav) files a police complaint of robbery where the entire house has gone missing. Chaturvedi is suspected of abolishing his own house in order to claim the insurance money. The case comes to the media's attention and soon becomes a topic of everyone's interests. Due to media pressure, authorities are forced to acknowledge the robbery. The film focuses on the loopholes of governance, bureaucracy and the attitude of people in power.

Cast
 Rajpal Yadav as Manav Chaturvedi & the narrator
 Amit Behl as a lawyer
 Asrani as Session Court lawyer
 Om Puri
 Mukesh Bhatt
 Mushtaq Khan
 Razak Khan
 Sharat Saxena
 Vivek Shauq
 Neeraj Sood
 Ashutosh Rana as Satyaprakash Choubey
 Mukesh Tiwari
 Manoj Joshi as Jagrut Jaganath
 Govind Namdeo as BMC Commissioner
 Dara Singh as S. P. Shastri
 Vikram Gokhale as S.P.
 Vijay Raaz as Munshiji
 Satyadev Dubey as Pagla Baba
 Nalneesh Neel as Bakra
 Arun Shekhar as Tiger

Production
This film was Rajpal Yadav's directorial debut. He also acted as music director and contributed in screenplay and dialogue. Yadav's small-budget films (including this one) were produced by Radha Yadav (Rajpal's wife) under the "Shree Naurang Godavari Entertainment Ltd." banner, which was named after Rajpal's parents. Sujeet Choubey, Amod Bhatt, and Sukhwinder Singh were the music directors for this film. The songs were written by Sameer and sung by Sukhwinder Singh.

Casting
The film had a huge star-cast of about 175 actors, the majority of whom had no prior acting experience in films. The ensemble cast included veteran Dara Singh and Satyadev Dubey, for both of whom this was their last film. Both died before the release of the film.

Release
The music of the film was launched by Amitabh Bachchan on 22 September 2012. The film was originally set to release in October 2012, but its release was stayed by Delhi High Court after a local businessman M. G. Agarwal filed a cheating case against director Rajpal Yadav. Agarwal alleged that Yadav had taken  as loan from him for the film and signed an agreement with Agarwal-owned Murli Projects for the music and overall production of the movie. He alleged that Yadav went ahead and independently released the music and all the cheques Yadav gave to Agarwal bounced. The film was finally released on 2 November 2012.

Reception
The Times of India criticised the film for weak script, repetitiveness, preachiness and lack of clarity. Songs were criticised for acting only as fillers without adding anything to the story. Koimoi.com praised the film for an experimental theatre play-like story telling, casting, and performances of Ashutosh Rana and Rajpal Yadav. But it criticised the film for lack of in-synch dialogues and abrupt ending. Navbharat Times criticised the movie for being noisy, weak script and inability of Yadav to make good use of the huge star cast. Commercially the film failed at the box office.

References

External links
 

2010s Hindi-language films
2012 films
Indian musical comedy films
Indian satirical films
2012 directorial debut films